The Garret Augustus Ackerman House is a historic house at 212 East Saddle River Road in Saddle River, Bergen County, New Jersey, United States. The house was built in 1832 and was added to the National Register of Historic Places on August 29, 1986.  It has apparently been demolished.

See also
National Register of Historic Places listings in Bergen County, New Jersey

References

Houses on the National Register of Historic Places in New Jersey
Houses completed in 1832
Houses in Bergen County, New Jersey
National Register of Historic Places in Bergen County, New Jersey
Saddle River, New Jersey
New Jersey Register of Historic Places